Shadow government may refer to:

Government
 An opposition grouping in a parliamentary system that mimics the structure of the actual government, in particular its cabinet (see Shadow Cabinet)
 A term for plans for an emergency government that takes over in the event of a disaster, see continuity of government
 A government-in-exile
 Shadow government (conspiracy), a conspiracy theory of a secret government

Arts and entertainment
 Shadow Government, a 2009 film by Cloud Ten Pictures
 "The Shadow Government", a song on the 2007 album The Else by They Might Be Giants
 "The Shadow Government", a sketch on the former radio show Morning Sedition
 The Shadow of Government, 2007 novel by Saudi writer Mundhir al-Qabbani

See also
 Deep state (disambiguation)
 Government in exile
 Shadow Government Statistics (Shadowstats.com), a website that offers alternatives to U.S. government economic statistics
 Smoke-filled room